Sidman may refer to:

 Arthur C. Sidman (1863–1901), American vaudeville performer and playwright
 Joyce Sidman (born 1956), American children's writer
 Murray Sidman, American psychologist
 Sidman Avoidance, his discovery
 Sam Sidman (1871–1948), American actor

Other uses 
 Sidman, Pennsylvania, a community in the United States